The Harsco Infrastructure Deutschland GmbH (formerly Hünnebeck GmbH), with its headquarters located in Ratingen, Germany, is a subsidiary of the Harsco Corporation.  The company develops, rents and sells formwork and scaffolding products for the main construction trade and civil engineering projects. Harsco Infrastructure also offers a range of services for the planning and development of projects, on top of logistics. The majority of the small- and medium-size enterprises which are its customers, come from the construction trade as well as the building industry, whereas, the revenues in the scaffolding segment are mainly composed of sales to non-industrial clients.

History 

Emil Mauritz Hünnebeck founded the Rautennetz GmbH in 1929 in Essen, which dedicated itself to the construction and further development of the "lozenge net" technique.  Then in 1937, the company relocated its main offices to Düsseldorf.  In the years that followed, large construction projects such as shipyards and airplane hangars were built inside and outside of the country utilizing patented methods.

In 1956, the Deutsche Stahllamelle Hünnebeck GmbH in Lintorf erected a plant with 16 halls, several administration buildings as well as a stockyard for the production of steel-tube props and telescopic ceiling beams on its 155,000 sqm large premises with private railway siding.  The company was later renamed to Hünnebeck GmbH in 1961.  The sales outside of Germany were made through contracts with exclusive importers.  At the beginning of the 1960s, the first foreign subsidiaries were founded, such as the Skandinavisk Hünnebeck A/S in Denmark, followed by subsidiaries in Austria in 1968 and Sweden in 1970.

Hünnebeck was taken over by the Thyssen AG in 1988 and thus merged with the affiliated service organization, RöRo.  As a result of Germany’s reunification, the company expanded into the new federal states with 12 further branch offices.  In 1995, the first steps were made in the U.S. and a 50% share of Safway Services Inc., in Milwaukee was acquired.  Nowadays the company is represented in more than 30 countries.  In Europe, the near and Middle-East, Africa and South America, Hünnebeck sells its products and services through 15 established subsidiaries, whereas the other countries are supplied through licensed distributors and dealers.

On 31 August 2003, the American investment company Sun Capital acquired most shares of Hünnebeck GmbH and its 9 European subsidiaries at that time.  As of November 2005, Hünnebeck officially became part of the Access Services division of the American Harsco Corporation, situated in Harrisburg/Pennsylvania.

At the end of 2009, the three tradition-rich companies, Hünnebeck, SGB and Patent, joined forces to operate under the common name Harsco Infrastructure. This gave rise to a global supplier of formwork, scaffolding and powered access equipment as well as industrial services with sales of approximately 1.11 billion US dollars (2011).

Prominent Projects 

•	Burj Khalifa, United Arab Emirates – Hünnebeck formwork technology was used in the construction of the highest skyscraper of the 21st century.

•	Golden Terrace, Poland – Hünnebeck equipment employed in the building of one of Europe’s biggest shopping centres.

•	Berlin Hauptbahnhof, Germany – For the construction of the new main rail station, Hünnebeck supplied the formwork solution for both office towers.

•	Hipogeno de Andacollo, Chile – Hünnebeck was part of one of the largest expansion projects for mines in South America.

•	Power Plant Boxberg, Germany – Great amounts of formwork and scaffolding equipment as well as intensive technical supervision were Hünnebeck’s main contributions to this large-scale project.

Pictures

External links 
 Website of Harsco Infrastructure Deutschland GmbH

Construction and civil engineering companies established in 1929
Construction and civil engineering companies of Germany
Companies based in North Rhine-Westphalia
German companies established in 1929